Joe Farago is an American actor, former stuntman and television personality. In 1985, he replaced Gene Rayburn as the host of the game show Break the Bank, having previously appeared as a celebrity guest three times during the show's first two weeks. He hosted more than 160 episodes.

Farago has appeared as a spokesman for shows including the "GT Express" countertop grill the "True Sleeper" foam mattress topper, T-Fal cookware and The Bissell Big Green Clean machine among others. He has hosted 35 infomercials seen in more than 70 countries around the world.

He was also the host of the 1990-91 HBO comedy show Night Rap with guests including Timothy Leary, Ed Koch, G. Gordon Liddy and Mel Brooks. He briefly appeared on Seinfeld in the episode "The Parking Garage".

In 2001, after the September 11 attacks, Farago became a firefighter. He was part of a Type II federal incident management team deploying to Hurricanes Katrina and Rita in 2005. He currently teaches FEMA/DHS public information officer and incident command courses to first responders and emergency management personnel across the country.

Filmography

External links
 
 

American male film actors
American game show hosts
American male television actors
Living people
Year of birth missing (living people)